Henik Lake is located in the Kivalliq Region of Nunavut, Canada. The lake is made up of two lakes, North Henik Lake and South Henik Lake with a narrows separating them.

History
In 1949, a group of Inuit, the Ihalmiut, were relocated from Ennadai Lake to Nueltin Lake but they later returned to Ennadai. In 1957, the Government of Canada relocated the Ihalmuit a second time but to Henik Lake, an area with few caribou and the group of 59 were soon starving. Among them were, Kikkik, who killed her half-brother in self-defence.

See also
List of lakes of Nunavut
List of lakes of Canada

References

Lakes of Kivalliq Region